Amnicon Falls is an unincorporated community located in the town of Amnicon, Douglas County, Wisconsin, United States.

Notes

Unincorporated communities in Douglas County, Wisconsin
Unincorporated communities in Wisconsin